Qermez Khalifeh may refer to:
 Qermez Khalifeh-ye Olya
 Qermez Khalifeh-ye Sofla